Clarkston High School may refer to:

Clarkston High School (Georgia), Clarkston, Georgia
Clarkston High School (Michigan), Independence Township, Michigan
Clarkston High School (Washington), Clarkston, Washington